was the forty-eighth of the  sixty-nine stations of the Nakasendō connecting Edo with Kyoto in Edo period Japan. It is located in former Mino Province in what is now part of the city of Mizunami, Gifu Prefecture, Japan.

History
In the early Edo period, the system of post stations on the Nakasendō was formalized by the Tokugawa shogunate in 1602. The route between Ōkute-juku and Mitake-juku was long and the terrain was difficult, crossing the Biwa-toge Pass, so another post station was established as a resting spot in-between in 1610. This was Hosokute-juku, and it is located within the territory of Owari Domain. The temple of Kaigen-in, the bodaiji of the Toki clan, the shugo of Mino Province in the Muromachi period is located nearby,

Hosokute-juku was 364.6 kilometers to Edo.

The route of the modern highway bypassed Hosokute-juku, so several old buildings of the post station have been preserved, including the honjin, Daikokuya, which is still open as an inn

Hosokute-juku in The Sixty-nine Stations of the Kiso Kaidō
Utagawa Hiroshige's ukiyo-e print of Hosokute-juku dates from 1835 -1838. The print depicts travelers climbing or descending a steep slope, with paddy fields and a range of mountains in the distance. In front is  samurai with a bamboo water canteen suspended from his sword. Following is a woman in green kimono with a powdered white face. Going up the slope are a farmer with a backpack followed by his wife with a  sickle. To the left , with only the upper half of his torso in view is a man with two bags, and the post station in the distance.

Neighboring Post Towns
Nakasendō
Ōkute-juku - Hosokute-juku - Mitake-juku

References

External links

Hiroshige Kiso-Kaido series
Hosokute-juku on Kiso Kaido Road
Gifu Nakasendo Guide

Notes

Stations of the Nakasendō
Post stations in Gifu Prefecture
Mizunami, Gifu
Mino Province